Jon Mayer (born September 7, 1938 in New York City) is an American jazz pianist and composer.

Discography

As leader
Round Up the Usual Suspects (1995) – with Ron Carter, Billy Higgins
Do It Like This (1998) – with Ernie Watts, Bob Maize, Harold Mason
Rip Van Winkle: Live at the Jazz Bakery (1999) – with Bob Maize, Harold Mason
Full Circle (2002) – with Rufus Reid, Victor Lewis
The Classics (Reservoir, 2004) – with Rufus Reid, Willie Jones III
Strictly Confidential (2005) – with Chuck Israels, Arnie Wise
My Romance (2006) – with Rufus Reid, Dick Berk
So Many Stars (2007) – with Rufus Reid, Roy McCurdy
Nightscape (2009) – with Rufus Reid, Roy McCurdy
The Art of the Ballad (2014) – solo piano
Live at the Athenaeum (2017) – with Darek Oles, Roy McCurdy

As sideman
With Jackie McLean
Strange Blues (Prestige, 1957)
 
With John Coltrane
Like Sonny (Roulette, 1958, 1960)

References
 [ Jon Mayer] at Allmusic
 Jon Mayer at All About Jazz

External links
 http://www.jonmayer.com/

American jazz pianists
American male pianists
1938 births
Living people
20th-century American pianists
21st-century American pianists
20th-century American male musicians
21st-century American male musicians
American male jazz musicians
Reservoir Records artists
Fresh Sounds Records artists